The Vital Spark is a fictional Clyde puffer, created by Scottish writer Neil Munro. As its captain, the redoubtable Para Handy, often says: "the smertest boat in the coastin' tred".

Background
Puffers seem to have been regarded fondly even before Munro began publishing his short stories in the Glasgow Evening News in 1905. This may not be surprising, for these small steamboats were then providing a vital supply link around the west coast and Hebrides islands of Scotland. The charming rascality of the stories went well beyond the reality of a commercial shipping business, but they brought widespread fame. They appeared in the newspaper over 20 years, were collected in book form by 1931, inspired the 1953 film The Maggie, and came out as three popular television series, dating from 1959 to 1995.

Description

In her captain's own (islands accented) words, the Vital Spark is "aal hold, with the boiler behind, four men and a derrick, and a watter-butt and a pan loaf in the foc'sle". The way these steam lighters with their steam-powered derricks could offload at any suitable beach or small pier is featured in many Vital Spark stories, and allows amusing escapades in the small west coast communities. The cargoes carried in the hold vary from gravel or coal to furniture to livestock, the crew's quarters in the forecastle are taken as lodgings by holidaymakers or lost children and the steam engine struggles on under the dour care of the engineer Macphail. Tales are recounted of improbably dramatic missions in World War I. Others scoff at her as a coal gaabbert, reflecting the origins of the puffers, but an indignant Para Handy is always ready to defend his boat, comparing her  speed and her looks with the glamorous Clyde steamers.

TV series featuring Vital Spark
The original BBC Series Para Handy - Master Mariner, which ran from 1959–60, starred Duncan Macrae (Para Handy), Roddy McMillan (The Mate), and John Grieve (Dan Macphail, the engineer). Six episodes were made, none of which survive.

In 1963 Macrae, McMillan and Grieve, accompanied by Alex Mackenzie and guitarist George Hill, recorded an album of songs, Highland Voyage. A short film was made to accompany the recording, filmed on board a puffer as it cruised around the Firth of Clyde. Macrae and McMillan appear as The Captain and The Mate, while Mackenzie appears as The Engineer, causing Grieve to move to play The Cook. Although very obviously based on Munro's characters, the names of Para Handy, the Vital Spark, etc. are never mentioned, probably due to copyright issues.

In the second version, The Vital Spark, McMillan took the role of Para Handy, and Grieve reprised his role as Macphail; Walter Carr (Dougie the Mate) and Alex McAvoy (Sunny Jim) completed the crew, and the series ran for three series between 1965 and 1974. The third series, made several years after the first two, was in colour and consisted of remakes of selected earlier episodes.

In 1994 BBC Scotland produced The Tales of Para Handy which starred Gregor Fisher in the lead role alongside Sean Scanlan as Dougie, Andrew Fairlie as Sunny Jim and Rikki Fulton as Dan Macphail. This ran for two series, a total of nine episodes, in 1994 and 1995. The series also featured David Tennant in one of his first acting roles. Alex McAvoy, who played Sunny Jim in The Vital Spark, appears in one episode as a fellow captain of Para Handy in the coastal trade.

Ships depicting Vital Spark

The stories sparked considerable interest in the puffers, and many books explore their now vanished world. 

In the third television series, The Tales of Para Handy, the Vital Spark was depicted by the puffer Auld Reekie (VIC 27). She is moored at Crinan awaiting restoration.
 
When VIC 72, renamed Eilean Eisdeal, ventured from her home at the Inveraray Maritime Museum to visit the Glasgow River Festival in 2005, she bore the name Vital Spark in testimony to her continuing popularity. In 2006 she was re-registered as the Vital Spark of Glasgow.

The Argyll brewer Fyne Ales, near Inveraray, where the current boat rests and Neil Munro was born, brews a beer called Vital Spark  in tribute to the series.

In December 2007, the Vital Spark Clyde puffer returned to the Forth and Clyde Canal – the place of her 'birth', as reported on STV news' Reporting Scotland.

The puffer is now on the slipway at Crinan boatyard awaiting restoration.

See also
List of fictional ships

Notes

References
Donald, Stuart (1994). In the Wake of the Vital Spark. Johnston & Bacon Books Ltd.  ( paperback)
McDonald, Dan (1977). The Clyde Puffer. David & Charles (Publishers) Ltd.

External links

Neil Munro
BBC Scotland - the wireless to the web
The Vital Spark (TV)
The Light in the Glens
The Vital Spark at Inveraray Maritime Museum
The New Tales of Para Handy Three new adventures for the crew of the Vital Spark, staged and filmed in front of a live audience at The Warehouse Theatre, Lossiemouth, Scotland (available on DVD)

Fictional ships
Ships of Scotland